Tarrazu may refer to:
 Tarrazú (canton)
 Tarrazú coffee